Vancouver College (abbreviated informally to VC) is an independent university-preparatory Catholic school for boys located in the Shaughnessy neighbourhood of Vancouver, British Columbia, Canada. Founded in 1922, it is the only independent Catholic all-boys school in British Columbia. Despite the school's Catholic denomination, it is open to students of all religions.

Manrell Hall
Manrell Hall opened in September 2019. The facilities were blessed by The Most Rev. Michael Miller, Archbishop of Vancouver on October 23, 2019. The new building consists of a new cafeteria, founder's atrium, learning centre, and classrooms, serving the school's curricular interests. The building was named after Mr. Manrell, who donated $5 million to the "Our Next Century" campaign.

Science and High Performance Wing
On November 2, 2007, Vancouver College officially opened the Holler Family Science Centre and the new South Gym. The facilities were blessed by The Most Rev. Raymond Roussin, SM, the former archbishop of Vancouver. They consist of four brand-new science classrooms, a "super" laboratory, a greenhouse, a new gymnasium, and several offices and classrooms serving the school's curricular and extra-curricular interests.

On January 30, 2008, construction had finished on the school's High Performance Fitness Centre. The Centre consists of two floors, the first being a cardiovascular training area containing Indoor Rowers, stationary bicycles, treadmills, and a stair climber. The upper floor functions as a weight-training facility where the athletics teams get weight training. The facility is known to be one of the best gyms in the lower mainland. The Fitness Centre is attached directly to the new South Gym, serving as an athletic complex for its students and staff. Following this, the Kutcher Centre for the Performing Arts opened in December 2008. The centre is a large underground theatre with complete audio visual systems

On September 26, 2009, Vancouver College celebrated the Blessing and Rededication of O’Hagan Field, featuring an all weather synthetic field. Other changes to O'Hagan include a track and a new playground for Elementary students.

The new South Gym was named the Dave Hardy Gym after David G. Hardy, the first lay principal of the school. On November 7, 2015, Vancouver College celebrated the rededication and renaming of the Dave Hardy Gym to the Christian Brothers Gym.

The school is now considered the Senior School as the old building has since been demolished and rebuilt. The elementary students go to the newest school located south of the Science Wing.

Principals

Sports
The school competes in many sports, including:

Badminton
Basketball
Cross country
Downhill skiing
Eating
Football
Lacrosse
Rowing
Snowboarding
Soccer
Swimming
Cycling
Track and field
Ultimate Frisbee
Volleyball
Wrestling
Tennis
Esports
Ice hockey
Golf

The competitive teams are known as the "Fighting Irish".

The Fighting Irish Varsity football team have won the BC provincial title in 1992, 1994, 2010, 2019,  and 2022.

Notes

Vancouver College's "sister" school is  Little Flower Academy and often engages in various activities and events together. It also has well-established relationships with York House School and Crofton House School.
The Vancouver College rowing team is considered one of the best in Canada. Every year the team competes at a high level during the National Regatta in St. Catharines, Ontario, and often winning gold in both Junior and Senior categories. 
The College has an amicable rivalry with St. George's School and competes in the annual Saints-College basketball series drawing in thousands of viewers all over the world. The football team draws in as much view for their homecoming games and the Archbishops Cup against Notre Dame.
The school is a popular shooting spot for television and film productions. A recent film production at the school is Wonder directed by Stephen Chbosky.

Notable alumni

 Jamie Boreham (born 1978), professional football player
 Bryan Chiu (born 1974), professional football player
 Christian Covington (born 1993), professional football player
 Bill Cunningham (1909–1993), photographer
 Peter Dyakowski (born 1984), professional football player
 Kevin Eiben (born 1979), professional football player
 Kevin Falcon (born 1963), financial executive and politician
 Sean Fleming (born 1970), professional football player
 Tony Gallagher (born 1948), journalist
 Philip Gilbert (1931–2004), actor
 Bart Hull (born 1969), professional football and hockey player
 Manny Jacinto (born 1987), actor
 Rysen John (born 1997), professional football player
 Adam Konar (born 1993), professional football player
 Cal Murphy (1932–2012), professional football coach
 Regan Oey (born 1998), actor
 Pete Ohler (born c. 1940), professional football player
 Finbarr O'Reilly (born 1971), photographer
 Tracy Pratt (born 1943), professional ice hockey player
 Marc Trasolini (born 1990), professional basketball player
 Angus Reid (born 1976), professional football player
 Philip Scrubb (born 1992), professional basketball player
 Thomas Scrubb (born 1991), professional basketball player

References

External links
Vancouver College 
Schools affiliated with Edmund Rice

Catholic secondary schools in British Columbia
Congregation of Christian Brothers secondary schools
Private schools in British Columbia
High schools in Vancouver
Elementary schools in Vancouver
Educational institutions established in 1922
1922 establishments in British Columbia
Boys' schools in Canada